This is a list of Hong Kong football transfers for the 2013 summer transfer window. Only moves featuring at least one First Division club are listed.

The summer transfer window was open from 12 July 2013 to 3 October 2013.

This list also includes transfers featuring at least one First Division club which were completed after the end of the winter 2012–13 transfer window and before the end of the 2013 summer window.

Players without a club may join at any time, and clubs may sign players on loan during loan windows.

Transfers

All players and clubs without a flag are Hongkonger.

 Player will officially join his club on 1 June 2013.

References

Transfers Summer 2013
2013
Hong Kong